Several ships have been named Globe:

 was launched at Virginia and served as a Baltimore-based privateer during the War of 1812. She captured 14 ships and had several engagements, including a three-hour action with an Algerine sloop of war.
 was launched at Scarborough and in 1818-1819 transported convicts to New South Wales; she was wrecked in 1824.
, of Nantucket, Massachusetts, was launched in 1815. In 1824 her crew mutinied, but eventually most of the mutineers were killed or captured, and the vessel itself returned to her owners' hands; she continued to whale until about 1828.

Ship names